Truax v Raich 239 US 33 (1915) is a US labor law case, concerning the right to work.

Facts
Arizona passed a law requiring employers to have 80% of their staff as natives. Raich was from Austria. He was an at will employee and was dismissed. He claimed this violated the equal protection clause of the Fourteenth Amendment to the United States Constitution.

Judgment
The Supreme Court held the Arizona law violated the Fourteenth Amendment to the United States Constitution.

Justice McReynolds dissented.

See also

US labor law

Notes

References

United States labor case law